The Electoral district of Northern Territory was an electoral district of the South Australian House of Assembly from 1890 to 1911. The electorate encompassed all of what is the Northern Territory when the Territory was included as part of South Australia for political purposes.

The district returned two members at each election and supported independent members for much of its existence.

The most prominent member for the electorate was Vaiben Louis Solomon, the twenty-first Premier of South Australia.

Members

See also
 Division of Northern Territory, a division of the Australian House of Representatives from 1922 to 2001.
 Parliament of the Northern Territory, created in 1948.

References
 Jaensch, D. (1990) The Legislative Council of the Northern Territory: An Electoral History 1947–1974, Australian National University North Australia Research Unit, Darwin. 
 James, B. (1995) Occupation Citizen, Self Published, Darwin. .

Former electoral districts of South Australia
1890 establishments in Australia
1911 disestablishments in Australia